Roswitha is a genus of beetles in the family Buprestidae, containing the following species:

 Roswitha bilyi Bellamy, 1997
 Roswitha endroedyi Bellamy, 1997

References

Buprestidae genera